Uuijeong, also the Right State Councilor, was the Third State Councillor of the Uijeongbu (State Council) during the Joseon Dynasty of Korea (1392 -1910). The Uuijeong was variously referred to as Usang, Ujeongseung, Ugyu, Uhap, or Udae.

Uuijeong was the lowest of the three prime ministers, ranked senior first (jeong-il-pum, Hangul: 정1품, Hanja: 正一品), roughly equal to the Second Deputy Prime Minister in modern day.

The position was created in 1400 by Taejong, replacing the former position Munha Usijung (문하우시중, 門下右侍中) during Goryeo period. Its name was changed to Uuijeongbusa (우의정부사, 右議政府事) in 1418, then to Uijeongbu Uuijeong (의정부우의정, 議政府右議政) in 1455.

During Joseon dynasty, Uuijeong was also granted posthumously as an honorable position to fathers-in-law of Grand Internal Prince (대원군, 大院君), Grand Prince (대군, 大君), or Crown Prince's son (세손, 世孫).

The position was abolished in 1894.

List of the Right State Councillors

See also
State Council of Joseon
Yeonguijeong
Jwauijeong
Yukjo
Joseon Dynasty politics

References

Joseon dynasty
Politics of Korea